Carrington Gomba (born 8 March 1985) is a Zimbabwean football midfielder who currently plays for Red Arrows.

References

1985 births
Living people
Zimbabwean footballers
Hwange Colliery F.C. players
Gunners F.C. players
Dynamos F.C. players
FC Saint-Éloi Lupopo players
CS Don Bosco players
Red Arrows F.C. players
Zimbabwe international footballers
Association football midfielders
Zimbabwe Premier Soccer League players
Linafoot players
Zimbabwean expatriate footballers
Expatriate footballers in the Democratic Republic of the Congo
Zimbabwean expatriate sportspeople in the Democratic Republic of the Congo
Expatriate footballers in Zambia
Zimbabwean expatriate sportspeople in Zambia